The Ostrog Monastery is a monastery of the Serbian Orthodox Church situated against an almost vertical background, high up in the large rock of Ostroška Greda, in Montenegro. It is dedicated to Saint Basil of Ostrog (Sveti Vasilije Ostroški), who was buried here. From the monastery, the Bjelopavlići plain can be seen. The monastery is located in Danilovgrad Municipality, 50 km away from Podgorica and 15 km away from Nikšić. Ostrog monastery is the most popular pilgrimage place in Montenegro.

History
 
 
The Monastery was founded by Vasilije, the Metropolitan Bishop of Herzegovina in the 17th century. He died there in 1671 and some years later he was glorified. His body is enshrined in a reliquary kept in the cave-church dedicated to the Presentation of the Mother of God to the Temple.

The present-day look was given to the Monastery in 1923–1926, after a fire which had destroyed the major part of the complex. The two little cave-churches were spared and they are the key areas of the monument. The frescoes in the Church of the Presentation were created towards the end of the 17th century. The other church, dedicated to the Holy Cross, is placed within a cave on the upper level of the monastery and was painted by master Radul, who successfully coped with the natural shapes of the cave and laid the frescoes immediately on the surface of the rock and the south wall. Around the church are monastic residences.

During World War II, a detachment of Chetniks led by Blažo Đukanović and Bajo Stanišić took refuge at Ostrog up to October 18, 1943, when Yugoslav Partisans promised the Chetniks that their lives would be spared if they surrendered. Đukanović and 23 Chetniks peacefully surrendered, expecting to be spared, but were all killed by the Partisans at Ostrog. Stanišić and three members of his extended family initially did not surrender, but did not survive at Ostrog. There are different accounts on what happened to Stanišić and his family; sources contradict each other on whether Stanišić and his family were killed fighting the Partisans or committed suicide at Ostrog.

The Orthodox monastery of Ostrog is one of the most frequently visited in the Balkans. It attracts over 100,000 visitors a year. It is visited by believers from all parts of the world, either individually or in groups. It represents the meeting place of all confessions: the Orthodox, the Catholics and the Muslims. According to the stories of pilgrims, by praying by his body, many have been cured and helped in lessening the difficulties in their lives.

Architecture

Upper monastery
The upper monastery houses the Church of the Presentation and the Church of the Holy Cross. Saint Basil of Ostrog's relics lie in the Church of the Presentation. Also of interest is the vine which grows out of the rock. It is said that it is a miracle because nothing should be able to grow out of the sheer rock face.

Lower monastery
 
The lower monastery centers on the Church of the Holy Trinity that was built in 1824. It also makes up most of the monk residences. There are dorm rooms available for pilgrims here too.

Traditions
It is traditional for pilgrims to walk the 3 km from the lower monastery to the upper monastery barefoot. Before entering the Church of the Presentation to pray before Saint Basil of Ostrog, pilgrims make a donation of clothing, blankets or consumables like soap for the monks. The monastery celebrates its feast day on 12 May every year. St Basil died on 29 April in the Orthodox calendar which equates to 12 May in the Gregorian calendar.

References

Sources

Serbian Orthodox monasteries in Montenegro
Christian monasteries established in the 17th century
17th-century Serbian Orthodox church buildings
Eastern Orthodox pilgrimage sites
Danilovgrad Municipality
Cave monasteries